Amphidromus baolocensis is a species of slender air-breathing tree snail, an arboreal gastropod mollusk in the family Camaenidae.

Habitat 
It is found on the ground, among leaf litter.

Distribution 
Its distribution includes Lâm Đồng Province, Central Vietnam.

Etymology 
This species is named for Bảo Lộc City of Vietnam.

References

baolocensis